"Show Me a Sign" is a song by the London-based dubstep and electronic rock band Modestep, and the fourth single from their debut studio album Evolution Theory. The single was first released on 6 May 2012 in the United Kingdom as a digital download. The song appears in the trailer of the racing video game Forza Horizon, as well as being on one of the radio stations within the game itself.

Music video
A music video to accompany the release of "Show Me a Sign" was first released onto YouTube on 19 March 2012 at a total length of five minutes and fifty-six seconds.

Track listing

Chart performance

Release history

References

2012 singles
Modestep songs
Polydor Records singles
2011 songs